Tuffalun is a commune in the Maine-et-Loire department of western France. The municipality was established on 1 January 2016 and consists of the former communes of Ambillou-Château, Louerre and Noyant-la-Plaine.

Population 
The population of each separate commune prior to the merge in 2016 were:

Ambillou-Château - 951 (2011)

Louerre - 382 (2006)

Noyant-la-Plaine - 268 (2006)

See also 
Communes of the Maine-et-Loire department

References 

Communes of Maine-et-Loire
States and territories established in 2016